Sheikh or Malak Fakhr ad-Dīn is a holy figure venerated in Yazidism, he is considered one of the Seven Divine Beings, to all of whom God assigned the World's affairs, and his earthly incarnation is considered one of the four sons of Ezdina Mir along with Nasirdin, Sheikh Shems, and Sejadin, who are the respective ancestors and patriarchs of the four Şemsanî Sheikh lineages and are considered to have been avatars of the angelic beings. Fexredîn is considered the personification of the Moon, while his brother, Sheikh Shems is the personification of the Sun.

Many Yazidi qewls (sacred hymns) are attributed to Fexredîn.

Biography
Şêx Fexredîn was a Yezidi poet, philosopher and scholar who lived in the 12th century, he authored much of the poetry that is still recited among the Yezidis today in form of sacred hymns known as Qewls. According to Yazidi religious teachers and men, Fexredîn is said to have authored 11,000 qewls, beyts and qesîdes, of which only around 200 remain due to religious oppression and genocides.

Family 
Fexreddin's father, Êzdîna Mîr, was a prominent 12th-century prince who ruled over the Yezidis, together with his wives Sitî Zîn and Sitî Ereb. Êzdîna Mîr was the father of the Yezidi saints Şêx Şems, Şêx Fexredîn, Şêx Nasirdîn and Şêx Sicadîn. Thus he is the forefather of all the Shamsanis.

Şêx Fexreddin had three sons and one daughter, his sons were Sheikh Bedir, Sheikh Aqub and the oldest of all, Sheikh Mend, who is an important Yezidi saint that became the ruler of Kilis Emirate and is today represented as the Lord of Snakes in the Yezidi religion.

There is a shrine in Ain Sifni dedicated to Sheikh Mend. Fexreddin's daughter was Xatûna Fexra, a female Yezidi saint represented as the Guardian of birth, pregnant women and therefore of fertility, Yezidi women fast once a year in her honor. Their descendants are still alive today and together also form their own Sheikh group within the Fexredîn group of the Shamsanis. The acting Baba Sheikh (Spiritual leader) of the Yezidis has to be from Fakhraddin lineage of Sheikhs. The current Baba Sheikh is Sheikh Ali Ilyas.

References

Year of birth unknown
Year of death unknown
Yazidi mythology
Yazidi history
12th-century Kurdish people
Yazidi religion
Yazidi holy figures
Moon myths